Amata trifascia  is a species of moth in the family Erebidae first described by Jeremy Daniel Holloway in 1976. It is found on Borneo.

References 

trifascia
Moths described in 1976
Moths of Borneo